Gardin (also Romanized as Gardīn; also known as Gardān and Gardīn-e Soflá) is a village in Sarduiyeh Rural District, Sarduiyeh District, Jiroft County, Kerman Province, Iran. At the 2006 census, its population was 56, in 14 families.

References 

Populated places in Jiroft County